Knoxville is an unincorporated community in Franklin County, Mississippi, United States.

History
Knoxville is located on the former Yazoo and Mississippi Valley Railroad. The community was incorporated in 1886 and named for Knoxville, Tennessee.

A post office operated under the name Knoxville from 1849 to 1955.

The Knoxville White Male and Female Academy was opened in Knoxville in 1886.

References

Unincorporated communities in Franklin County, Mississippi
Unincorporated communities in Mississippi